Johann Nopel der Jüngere (6 Jan 1548 – 6 Jun 1605) was a Roman Catholic prelate who served as Auxiliary Bishop of Cologne (1601-1605).

Biography
Johann Nopel der Jüngere was born in Lippstadt on 6 Jan 1548. On 10 Sep 1601, he was appointed during the papacy of Pope Clement VIII as Auxiliary Bishop of Cologne and Titular Bishop of Cyrene. On 10 Mar 1602, he was consecrated bishop by Coriolani Garzadoro, Bishop of Ossero. He served as Auxiliary Bishop of Cologne until his death on 6 Jun 1605.

References

External links and additional sources
 (for Chronology of Bishops) 
 (for Chronology of Bishops)  
 (for Chronology of Bishops) 
 (for Chronology of Bishops)  

17th-century Italian Roman Catholic bishops
Bishops appointed by Pope Clement VIII
1548 births
1605 deaths